Election (literal title: Black Society, a common Cantonese reference to the triads), is a 2005 Hong Kong crime film directed by Johnnie To. Featuring a large ensemble cast, the film stars Simon Yam and Tony Leung Ka-fai as two gang leaders engaged in a power struggle to become the new leader of a Hong Kong triad.

The film premiered as an "Official Selection" at the 2005 Cannes Film Festival, before being released in Hong Kong on 20 October 2005, with a Category III rating. A sequel, Election 2 (also known as Triad Election in the United States), was released in 2006.

Hilary Hongjin He, a doctoral student at the University of Western Sydney, stated that compared to its sequel, this film is "less political or suspicious" from a Mainland standpoint.

Plot 
In Hong Kong, the Hongmen-descendant and 50,000-strong triad Wo Lin Shing elects a new chairman every two years. The two leading contenders of the current election, Lok and Big D, carry out some last-minute "campaigning". Lok is calm, patient and even-tempered, while Big D, who attempts to buy the election with bribes, is boisterous, impatient and quick-tempered. After some quarrelling among both candidates' supporters, the triad's elders elect Lok as the new chairman. Big D refuses to honour the result, and instead attempts to obtain the triad's dragonhead baton, a symbol of the chairman's authority, from Whistle, the previous chairman. Whistle orders for the baton to be hidden. Lok also has his supporters search for the baton.

The police step in to prevent infighting and maintain the peace by arresting the triad's key figures, including Whistle, Big D, and Lok, who is handcuffed and taken away in front of his young son. However, due to a lack of incriminating evidence, the triad members can only be temporarily detained. During the arrest, Big D attacks Whistle, causing Whistle to be hit by a car. A grievously injured Whistle indicates intent to testify to the police's anti-triad unit to expose Big D; this extends Big D's detention. Not wanting the triad's crimes to be exposed, Lok has his lawyer convince Whistle to kill himself to ensure Whistle's family's safety. While in custody, the police allow the triad elders to try to broker peace, but Big D threatens to break away from Wo Lin Shing and form a new triad, which would upset triad tradition and bring about much violence; this causes most of the triad unites against Big D.

Various triad members attempt to retrieve the baton, including Jimmy, whose triad member uncle and boss were both severely injured by Big D for supposedly costing him the election. After some intercepting and fighting between triad members, Jimmy ultimately acquires the baton, and gives it to Lok after Lok states that he can improve the triad's earnings. Lok rewards those who assisted him in obtaining the baton (Big Head, Jet, Jimmy, Kun, and Mr. So) with privileges of becoming his godsons. Big D is released on bail after it is paid by Lok. Using the baton, Lok secures his position as the triad's new chairman and offers a deal to Big D. If Big D accepts Lok as chairman, they will take over the lucrative Tsim Sha Tsui area together, Lok will protect Big D's businesses and support Big D for chairmanship at the next election in two years; Big D accepts. The high-ranking triad members, including Lok and Big D, pledge loyalty to each other and the triad during Lok's swearing-in ceremony.

When a rival triad boss offers Big D the chance to improve his earnings on the condition that Big D betray Lok, Big D reacts by calling Lok in for an apparent ambush. This is a double cross; Lok and Big D trap and murder the rival triad boss. Eventually, Lok and Big D successfully take over Tsim Sha Tsui. During a fishing trip, Big D expresses interest in becoming a co-chairman of the triad along with Lok, pointing out that other triads have such arrangements. Lok responds that this is not their triad's tradition, but Big D does not change his mind. Lok feigns supporting Big D's idea, then murders Big D with a rock; this is witnessed by Lok's son and Big D's wife. She tries to flee, but Lok strangles her to death. Lok buries Big D and leaves the scene with his shaken son.

Cast

 Simon Yam as Lok
 Tony Leung Ka-fai as Big D
 Louis Koo as Jimmy
 Nick Cheung as Jet
 Gordon Lam as Kun
 Cheung Siu-fai as Mr. So
 Lam Suet as Big Head
 Wong Tin-lam as Uncle Teng
 Tam Ping-man as Uncle Cocky
 Maggie Shiu as Big D's wife
 David Chiang as Chief Superintendent Hui
 You Yong as China Police Captain
 Berg Ng as Senior Inspector Tod
 Raymond Wong as Detective Wong
 Law Wing-cheong as Four-Eyes
 Kwok Fung as Fish-Head

Development
According to To, he had no intention of making a version of this film for Mainland China. The production company made an altered version anyway, titled Longcheng Suiyue. According to Hilary He, this version has "ten major cuts or changes". An undercover law enforcement agent is added in this version, while the scene revealing that a mafia member was being used by the PRC Central Government as a mole was omitted. One scene erases a mention of the Birth tourism in Hong Kong, where Mainland Chinese parents give birth in Hong Kong so their children become Hong Kong permanent residents. In this version all of the criminals face arrest and there is a scene where elders give lessons to youth about avoiding the mafia.

Release

Box office
At the end of its box-office run in Hong Kong, Election grossed about HK$15.59 million, which is considered to be quite high for a film that received a Category III rating (18+ restriction) in Hong Kong.

Reception
The A.V. Club's Ignatiy Vishnevetsky writes, "[Johnnie] To’s saga makes plain that self-interest, far more than traditional ideas about honor, defines contemporary crooks. While that’s hardly an astonishing revelation, the writer-director deftly generates suspense (as well as sly comedy) from a mood of all-consuming untrustworthiness. [...] Thrilling and amusing in equally dark measure, it’s an incisive portrait of a dysfunctional family-style organization struggling to update its sordid operation in an age of unchecked capitalist greed."

Distribution
Election was sold to more than 21 territories, including Optimum Releasing for the United Kingdom, ARP Sélection for France and Hopscotch Films for Australia, after screening at the 2005 Cannes Film Festival in competition. Tartan Films has acquired all United States rights to this movie as of May 2006.

Awards and nominations
The movie is notable in being nominated for 14 Golden Horse Awards in Hong Kong cinema. The film was named Best Film of 2005 in the Hong Kong Film Critics Society Awards, with To also clinching Best Director honours for the movie.

See also
 Johnnie To filmography
 List of Hong Kong films
 List of movies set in Hong Kong

References

External links
Election at LoveHKFilm.com
 
 
 

2005 films
2000s crime films
Hong Kong crime films
Triad films
2000s Cantonese-language films
Films directed by Johnnie To
Best Film HKFA
Milkyway Image films
China Star Entertainment Group films
Films set in Hong Kong
Films shot in Hong Kong
Films with screenplays by Yau Nai-hoi
2000s Hong Kong films